Myripristis murdjan is a species of soldierfish found in the Indo-Pacific.

References

External links
 
 
 

murdjan
Fish described in 1775
Taxa named by Peter Forsskål